Philasterides is a genus of ciliates in the order Philasteridae.

The species P. dicentrarchi was previously considered a junior synonym of Miamiensis avidus. However, recent physiological and molecular studies have shown that P. dicentrarchi and M. avidus are different species.

References

External links 
 

Philasterida
Ciliate genera